Raimundo Pais de Riba de Vizela (?–?) was a Portuguese nobleman, who served as tenente of Covilhã,  Gouveia and  Besteiros.

He was born in the Iberian Peninsula, son of Paio Pires de Guimarães and Elvira Fernandes, belonging to a noble Portuguese Galician family. He was married to Dórdia Afonso de Riba Douro, daughter of Afonso Viegas and Aldara Pires, a noble woman, daughter of Pedro Fróilaz de Traba.

References

External links 
www.rickster.org

12th-century Portuguese people
Portuguese nobility